California's 24th State Senate district is one of 40 California State Senate districts. It is currently represented by Democrat Maria Elena Durazo of Los Angeles.

District profile 
The district encompasses central Los Angeles and its immediate environs, most notably East Los Angeles. The district is heavily Latino with a sizable Asian population.

Los Angeles County – 9.5%
 East Los Angeles
 Los Angeles – 21.3%
 Arlington Heights – partial
 Arts District
 Atwater Village – partial
 Boyle Heights
 Chinatown
 Cypress Park
 Eagle Rock
 East Hollywood
 Echo Park
 El Sereno
 Elysian Valley
 Glassell Park
 Harvard Heights
 Hermon
 Highland Park
 Koreatown
 Larchmont – partial
 Lincoln Heights
 Little Armenia
 Little Tokyo
 Los Feliz – partial
 Montecito Heights
 Mount Washington
 Silver Lake
 Thai Town
 Westlake

Election results from statewide races

List of senators 
Due to redistricting, the 24th district has been moved around different parts of the state. The current iteration resulted from the 2011 redistricting by the California Citizens Redistricting Commission.

Election results 1994 - present

2018

2014

2010

2006

2002

1998

1994

See also 
 California State Senate
 California State Senate districts
 Districts in California

References

External links 
 District map from the California Citizens Redistricting Commission

24
Government of Los Angeles County, California
Government of Los Angeles
Central Los Angeles
Eastside Los Angeles
Northeast Los Angeles
Atwater Village, Los Angeles
Boyle Heights, Los Angeles
Downtown Los Angeles
Chinatown, Los Angeles
Cypress Park, Los Angeles
Eagle Rock, Los Angeles
East Hollywood, Los Angeles
Echo Park, Los Angeles
El Sereno, Los Angeles
Glassell Park, Los Angeles
Hollywood Hills
Koreatown, Los Angeles
Lincoln Heights, Los Angeles
Los Angeles River
Los Feliz, Los Angeles
Montecito Heights, Los Angeles
Mount Washington, Los Angeles
San Rafael Hills
Santa Monica Mountains
Silver Lake, Los Angeles
Westlake, Los Angeles